Malcolm Duncan "Max" Carmichael (20 April 1920 – 11 December 1987) was an Australian rules footballer who played with Hawthorn in the Victorian Football League (VFL).

Recruited from Hastings-Tyabb in the Peninsula FL, where in 1938 he kicked 92 goals for the season, Carmichael kicked 3 goals on his debut but didn't trouble the scorers again.

Notes

External links 

1920 births
1987 deaths
Australian rules footballers from Victoria (Australia)
Hawthorn Football Club players
People from Hastings, Victoria